A Passenger Disappeared (Spanish: Ha desaparecido un pasajero) is a 1953 Spanish crime film directed by Alejandro Perla and starring Rafael Durán, María Rivas and Mario Berriatúa.

Cast
 Rafael Durán as Inspector Torres 
 María Rivas as Régina  
 Mario Berriatúa as Agente  
 Ramón Elías as Gángster  
 Santiago Rivero as Gángster  
 Lina Yegros as La madre  
 Carmen Sánchez as Ciudadana 
 Valeriano Andrés
 Manuel Arbó
 Manuel Bermúdez 'Boliche'
 Xan das Bolas
 José Luis Brugada
 Joaquín Burgos
 José Castro Tallón
 Maruja Coral
 Francisco de Cossío
 Antonio de Salazar
 Beni Deus
 Antonio Ferrandis
 Eulalia Iglesias
 Milagros Leal
 Jacinto Martín
 José María Martín
 Ignacio Mateos
 José María Meana
 Manuel Monroy
 Antonio Moreno
 Julio Pelagón
 Diana Salcedo
 Otto Sirgo
 Salvador Soler Marí
 Blanca Suárez
 Aníbal Vela 
 Juan Vázquez 
 Pablo Álvarez Rubio

References

Bibliography 
 de España, Rafael. Directory of Spanish and Portuguese film-makers and films. Greenwood Press, 1994.

External links 
 

1953 crime films
Spanish crime films
1953 films
1950s Spanish-language films
Spanish black-and-white films
1950s Spanish films